Alexander Onufrievich Kovalevsky (7 November 1840 in Vorkovo, Dvinsky Uyezd, Vitebsk Governorate, Russian Empire – 1901, St. Petersburg, Russian Empire) was a Russian Imperial embryologist, who studied medicine at the University of Heidelberg and became professor at the University of St Petersburg.
He was the brother of the paleontologist Vladimir Kovalevsky, and the brother-in-law of the mathematician Sofya Kovalevskaya.

Discoveries

Kowalevsky's family belonged to Russian nobility. 

He showed that all animals go through a period of gastrulation.

Kovalevsky discovered that tunicates are not molluscs, but that their larval stage has a notochord and pharyngeal slits, like vertebrates. Further, these structures develop from the same germ layers in the embryo as the equivalent structures in vertebrates, so he argued that the tunicates should be grouped with the vertebrates as chordates. 19th-century zoology thus converted embryology into an evolutionary science, connecting phylogeny with homologies between the germ layers of embryos, foreshadowing evolutionary developmental biology.

Honors
He was elected on the 1st of May 1884 a Foreign Member of the Linnean Society of London. The St. Petersburg Society of Naturalists annually awards the A.O. Kovalevsky Medal.

Bibliography

References

1840 births
1901 deaths
People from Preiļi Municipality
People from Dvinsky Uyezd
People from the Russian Empire of Polish descent
Privy Councillor (Russian Empire)
Biologists from the Russian Empire
Russian zoologists
Russian embryologists
Full members of the Saint Petersburg Academy of Sciences
Foreign Members of the Royal Society
Recipients of the Order of Saint Stanislaus (Russian), 1st class
Recipients of the Pour le Mérite (civil class)